Charlie Brooker's Screenwipe is a British television review programme broadcast on BBC Four written and presented by Charlie Brooker. The programme contains reviews of current shows, as well as stories and commentary on how television is produced. Series one was referred to by Brooker as a "series of three pilots", after which the programme was commissioned for a longer run. The series has run for five series, plus several specials on BBC Four, although repeats have been shown on BBC Two.

Episodes

Series 1

Series 2

2006 Christmas specials

Series 3

Series 4

Series 5

2009 Review of the Year

2010 Wipe

2011 Wipe

2012 Wipe

2013 Wipe

2014 Wipe

2015 Wipe

2016 Wipe

The Best of 2010–2015 Wipe with Charlie Brooker

Antiviral Wipe

See also 
 Newswipe with Charlie Brooker
 Charlie Brooker's Gameswipe
 Charlie Brooker's Weekly Wipe

References

External links

List of Charlie Brooker's Screenwipe episodes at the British Comedy Guide

Lists of British comedy television series episodes
Lists of British non-fiction television series episodes